Charles Liebmann (November 16, 1837 – June 12, 1928) was a German-born American  brewer and president of S. Liebmann Brewery (later Rheingold Breweries) in Brooklyn, New York. The brewery's main brand Rheingold Extra Dry was one of the most popular beer brands in New York City in the 1940s to 1960s.

Biography
Charles Liebmann was born to a Jewish family in Schmiedelfeld in 1837, the son of Dara (née Selz) and Samuel Liebmann. His father was, at the time, the owner of the estate Schloss Schmiedelfeld. In 1840, the family moved to Ludwigsburg and ran the inn "Zum Stern" and its attached brewery; and where the young Liebmann attended secondary school. His father determined to immigrate to the United States for political reasons and sent Charles' brother in 1850 in advance to procure a home. In 1854, the remainder of the family immigrated settling in Williamsburg, Brooklyn. The family first operated the old Maasche Brewery while Charles worked as a cooper at the F. & M. Schaefer Brewing Company. Pooling their resources, the family built a new brewery in Bushwick named the S. Liebmann Brewery.

After the death of his father in 1872, the three sons took over the management of the brewery and renamed it S. Liebmann's Sons Brewing Company. The Liebmann brothers alternated with each other as chief executive officer each year. Charles Liebmann was considered the technical director of the company.
In 1903, the Liebmann brothers retired and handed over the management of the company to six of their sons.

Personal life
On October 22, 1865, Liebmann married Sophia Bendix; they had four children:
 Henry Liebmann (born August 19, 1866), died as a child
 Julius Liebmann (November 16, 1868 - October 8, 1957)
 Alfred Liebmann (July 20, 1871 - December 1957), married to Alma Wallach Liebmann (1882-1938), 2 children: 
Dorothea Liebmann, married to Roger Williams Straus Jr., son of Gladys Eleanor Guggenheim Straus
Philip Liebmann (February 19, 1915 - February 2, 1972), married Dorothy Walp in 1942, divorced 1943; married Linda Darnell in 1954, divorced; married Joan Barry in 1955, sister of Al Barry 
 Amanda Liebmann (born September 10, 1872)

Liebmann died on June 12, 1928 in New York City.

References

 Die Liebmann Brauerei in New York, retrieved August 15, 2014.
 Find a Grave: Samuel Liebmann, retrieved August 15, 2014.
 
 Carl Schlegel: Schlegel’s American Families of German Ancestry, S. 236ff. retrieved August 15, 2014.
 Bernhard Purin: "My Beer is Rheingold – the dry Beer". Die Liebmanns, Hermann Schülein und Miss Rheingold. In: Lilian Harlander, Bernhard Purin (Hg.): Bier ist der Wein dieses Landes. Jüdische Braugeschichten, Volk Verlag, München 2016, S. 207––229.
 The Liebmann Family and the New York Society for Ethical Culture, retrieved August 15, 2014.

1837 births
1928 deaths
American Jews
American brewers
German emigrants to the United States
Liebmann family